The 2001 Island Games on the Isle of Man was the 7th edition in which a men's football (soccer) tournament was played at the multi-games competition. It was contested by 12 teams.

Guernsey won the tournament for the first time.

Participants

 Isle of Man

Group Phase

Group 1

Group 2

Group 3

Group 4

Placement play-off matches

9th – 12th place semi-finals

5th – 8th place semi-finals

11th place match

9th place match

7th place match

5th place match

Final stage

Semi-finals

3rd place match

Final

Final rankings

Top goalscorers

5 goals
  Chris Higgins
 Daniel Craven

4 goals
 Liam Gearing

3 goals
 Maiko Molder
 James Reilly*
 Roy Chipolina*
 Grant Chalmers*

* May have scored more

External links
Official 2001 website

Men
Gibraltar in international football
2001